Anoya Zulu Boys Secondary school is situated in Kapata, Chipata, Zambia. The school is named after freedom fighter Anoya Zulu. It is one of the cleanest Secondary schools if not the cleanest in Eastern Province.

Anoya Zulu Secondary School is nicknamed Togo boys or Muzimu Wa Togo. The uniform is a white long-sleeved shirt, black tie, black trousers, grey/white/black socks, and black trousers.

The school's motto is "Knowledge is Power".

History
On 16 March 2012, students of Chizongwe Technical Secondary School broke window panes of classrooms, the office block and the library of Anoya Zulu Secondary School, and broke windscreens of 17 vehicles, causing damage estimated to have a total value of K121,628,050.

References

Secondary schools in Zambia
Buildings and structures in Eastern Province, Zambia